Johnny Mathis has recorded 73 studio albums, 18 of which achieved sales of 500,000 units and were awarded Gold certification by the Recording Industry Association of America. Five of his greatest hits albums also accomplished this, and of these 18 Gold albums, six eventually went Platinum by reaching sales of one million copies. In 1999, sales figures totaled five million for his first holiday LP, Merry Christmas, and three million for Johnny's Greatest Hits, a 1958 collection that has been described as the "original greatest-hits package" and once held the record for most weeks on Billboard magazine's album chart with a total of 490 (three of which were spent at number one). His second longest album chart run was the 295 weeks belonging to his Platinum 1959 album Heavenly, which gave him five weeks in the top spot. In a ranking of the top album artists of the last half of the 1950s in terms of Billboard chart performance, he comes in at number two, for the 1960s, number 10, and for the period from 1955 to 2009 he is at number six.

The recurring appearance of Mathis holiday releases on the various album charts in Billboard began with 1958's Merry Christmas, which peaked at number three during the four weeks it spent that holiday season on the magazine's biggest album chart (now known as the Billboard 200) and returned to place at various positions within the top 40 slots there for the next four years. When the magazine first had a separate chart for Christmas albums from 1963 to 1973, Merry Christmas ranked somewhere in the top 10 on it for another seven years, and on the Top Pop Catalog chart that was created for older titles, it had eight return appearances during the 1990s. His  Sounds of Christmas LP spent two weeks at number two on the Christmas Albums chart upon its 1963 release and re-charted for the next five years, and 1969's Give Me Your Love for Christmas reached number one there during its first of several annual chart showings before achieving Platinum certification. Other notable holiday projects include Home for Christmas, a 1990 home video special that went platinum, and Sending You a Little Christmas, a 2013 release that earned him a Grammy nomination in the category of Best Traditional Pop Vocal Album.

Mathis also recorded 43 songs that reached Billboard magazine's Hot 100 chart in the United States and another nine that "bubbled under" the Hot 100. Six of these 52 recordings made the top 10, including 1957's "Chances Are" and the 1978 Deniece Williams duet, "Too Much, Too Little, Too Late", which each spent a week at number one, and 32 of them are also on the list of 50 entries that Mathis had on the magazine's Easy Listening chart, which was started in 1961. 19 of those 50 songs made the top 10 on that list, and two of them ("I'm Coming Home" and "Too Much, Too Little, Too Late") went on to number one. The Williams duet also spent four weeks at number one on the magazine's R&B chart and was certified Gold after selling one million copies.

In the UK Mathis spent three weeks at number one on the singles chart in 1976 with "When a Child Is Born" and had two compilations reached the top spot on the albums chart: 1977's The Mathis Collection and 1980's Tears and Laughter. "Too Much, Too Little, Too Late" and "When a Child Is Born" both achieved Silver certification for singles by the British Phonographic Industry for sales of 250,000 units in the UK, and the latter eventually reached the 500,000 mark to earn Gold certification. 16 of his LPs met the 60,000 album sales mark in the UK to be certified Silver, with eight of those going on to sell 100,000 copies for Gold certification and one of those eight (The Johnny Mathis Collection, 1976) making it to the 300,000 total necessary for the Platinum award.

The first Columbia phase

Mathis's self-titled 1956 debut album was produced by George Avakian, who was then the head of the Popular department at Columbia Records and signed Mathis to the label after seeing him perform in San Francisco. For the liner notes on the back cover of the album he wrote, "Johnny's singing is thoroughly jazz-oriented, so naturally arrangers were chosen who had a thorough command of the jazz idiom, as well as the ability to write imaginatively for a pop vocalist." Although the album received good reviews from jazz critics, it did not make any chart appearances in Billboard magazine.

The young performer's presence at Columbia then gained the attention of another executive, the chief of the popular music division, Mitch Miller, who presented Mathis with a stack of demonstration recordings and sheet music when they met so that the singer could choose what he wanted to record. The resulting session on September 21, 1956, produced his first two pop chart entries, "Wonderful! Wonderful!", which peaked at number 14, and "It's Not for Me to Say", which got as high as number five. Avakian helmed a second LP, Wonderful, Wonderful, in March 1957, and another session with Miller on June 16 of that year produced his next two hits: the number one recording "Chances Are" and its flip side, "The Twelfth of Never", which made it to number nine. Both the sophomore effort and the double-sided single made their respective album and pop chart debuts in September of that year, with the Wonderful, Wonderful  album reaching number four without having the song that it was named for or any of his past or present hits included on it.

Despite the fact that Mathis did not have another song make the top 10 on the pop chart until 1962, his next 11 LPs, including Johnny's Greatest Hits, Merry Christmas, and Heavenly, all reached the top 10 on the album chart, and several of them were awarded certification for their healthy sales figures. The number of weeks these albums were able to maintain a chart position is especially impressive when considering the fact that Billboard only ranked anywhere between 15 and 50 LPs until 1961 when their chart for mono albums expanded to 150 positions. Heavenly'''s 1960 follow-up Faithfully lasted 75 weeks and was followed by Johnny's Mood, which entered the chart in the issue dated August 29, 1960, and remained there for 65 weeks. His next release was his last in the string of top-tens, The Rhythms and Ballads of Broadway, a double album that debuted just five weeks later in the issue dated October 3 and made it as high as number six but only charted for 27 weeks, dropping off the list 33 weeks before its predecessor did. After that he returned to single LPs with I'll Buy You a Star, which had its first chart appearance in the May 15, 1961, issue on the newly expanded list but only got as high as number 38 during its 23 weeks there. The rest of his album output during this first era at Columbia fell short of the performance in terms of sales, peak chart positions, and number of weeks charted that the earlier records achieved.

The Mercury years

When Mercury Records invited him to join their label in 1963, they offered him what he described as "an awful lot of money" in addition to total control over his recording activities and ownership of the recording masters. He said, "I was the product of a very strong, determined woman named Helen Noga who did all my business transactions. She was the one who was adamant about me getting more money for my work. I had no idea that I was going to go to Mercury until it really happened." Since the new surroundings came with the option to produce his own albums, he took advantage of the opportunity to expand his duties, starting with his first release of 1964, Tender Is the Night, and continuing on through several LPs. "But I wasn't a producer," he admitted, " and I didn't really realize until then how important producers were and how much they assisted me in my work." While his first three projects as producer all made the top half of the album chart, his 1964 album of Latin American recordings, Olé, did not appear there at all.

In the fall of 1964 he recorded what he thought would be his next release, a collection of songs that came to be known as Broadway because of their inclusion in musicals, but it was shelved by Mercury and not available until 2012, when most of the masters he owned from this period were issued on compact disc for the first time. In his review for AllMusic, Al Campbell writes, "At the time, Mercury felt the album was too upbeat and not the type of romantic material Mathis had been so successful with during his previous tenure with Columbia." For his next three projects, Love Is Everything, The Sweetheart Tree, and The Shadow of Your Smile, the role of producer was filled by someone else. The album jacket for Love Is Everything supplied a credit reading, "Produced by Global Records, Inc.," which was his production company, but in the liner notes for The Complete Global Albums Collection, the album's credits list Al Ham as the producer. Norman Newell is acknowledged in the box set as the one taking on those duties for The Sweetheart Tree, and for The Shadow of Your Smile the credit goes to Don Rieber.

Mathis produced the two final albums in his contract and was ready for a change. In the liner notes for the compact disc release of those two albums, So Nice and Johnny Mathis Sings, he is quoted as saying, "'The only time I was not secure in what I was doing was during the three years I was with Mercury.'" Having started out with the clear guidance he received in the early years that he recorded made the absence of it at Mercury unpleasant. "'It just didn't work as well as it did at Columbia.'"

The second Columbia phase

Steve Ritz describes how the music industry had changed by the time Mathis returned to Columbia in the late 60s: "Pop singers, if they were to continue to be viable, were expected to record what became known in the industry as 'cover' albums, collections whereby a certain artist would 'cover' -- or record his/her own version of -- recent tunes that had been successful for other performers." His first album upon returning was named after the biggest hit song that he was covering on it, "Up, Up and Away", which The 5th Dimension took to number seven on the pop chart just months earlier. Several more cover albums named after other people's hit songs made the album charts throughout the 1970s, his most successful one being You Light Up My Life from 1978, which had the original number one hit song "Too Much, Too Little, Too Late" to help it reach number nine on the album chart and Platinum certification. He tried more duets and new songs on subsequent releases but was unable to re-create this sort of magic with the lightweight pop he was used to offering.

Nile Rodgers and Bernard Edwards were the production team behind their own band Chic's number ones "Le Freak" and "Good Times as well as the Sister Sledge hits "He's the Greatest Dancer" and "We Are Family". In February 1981 Mathis entered the studio to record songs that the duo had written and were producing as his next album, which was given the same name as one of the tracks, I Love My Lady. The project was completed, but "nobody said anything over at Columbia, and a best-of album [The First 25 Years – The Silver Anniversary Album] came out instead." When asked in a 2011 radio interview as to why the album had never been released, Mathis gave a brief chuckle as he replied, "Probably because the record company is almighty when you're making music to sell. They have their likes and dislikes....I guess because they didn't think it would sell." The singer pressed on through the early 1980s with more albums of new material that had unimpressive sales, as was the case with Right from the Heart, which became only his third out of 55 studio releases that did not make one of the album charts in Billboard.

In 1983 Linda Ronstadt took a break from recording contemporary music in order to make an album of standards with conductor Nelson Riddle, and their collaboration, What's New went triple Platinum. Barbra Streisand's 1985 release The Broadway Album reached number one and went on to quadruple Platinum certification, so a renewed interest in what came to be known as traditional pop was evident. Mathis had not tried a studio album without current hits or new songs since the ill-fated Broadway project in 1965, so his choice to collaborate with Henry Mancini in 1986 for The Hollywood Musicals, which had a lineup of classics that were mostly from the 1940s, was quite a change of pace. And while he has done some albums of contemporary pop songs since then, the category in which he has received four Grammy nominations since 1992 has been Best Traditional Pop Vocal Album, and the industry has recognized his past work as well. Three of his recordings have been inducted into the Grammy Hall of Fame ("Chances Are" in 1998, "Misty" in 2002, and "It's Not for Me to Say" in 2008), and in 2003 he was given the Grammy Lifetime Achievement Award.

Albums

Studio albums

Album reissues
Many of the albums that Mathis recorded were originally available in the vinyl LP, 8-track tape, Reel-to-reel, and audio cassette formats but were later reissued on compact disc. With close to 80 minutes of space available on each disc, it was possible to combine two albums on one CD, and several Mathis albums have been paired up and reissued in this format, as shown in the collapsed table below:

Compilation albums

Live albums

Singles

Duet partners:* Deniece Williams** Jane Olivor*** Stephanie Lawrence**** Paulette# Gladys Knight## Dionne Warwick### Regina Belle

Holiday 100 chart entries
Since many radio stations in the US adopt a format change to Christmas music each December, many holiday hits have an annual spike in popularity during the last few weeks of the year and are retired once the season is over. In December 2011, Billboard began a Holiday Songs chart with 50 positions that monitors the last five weeks of each year to "rank the top holiday hits of all eras using the same methodology as the Hot 100, blending streaming, airplay, and sales data", and in 2013 the number of positions on the chart was doubled, resulting in the Holiday 100. A handful of Mathis recordings have made appearances on the Holiday 100 and are noted below according to the holiday season in which they charted there.

Box setsThe Music of Johnny Mathis: A Personal Collection (1993)The Complete Global Albums Collection (2014)The Singles (2015)The Complete Christmas Collection 1958–2010 (2015)The Voice of Romance: The Columbia Original Album Collection (2017)

Video releasesHome for Christmas (1990)Live by Request: Johnny Mathis (2001)Johnny Mathis: Wonderful, Wonderful!'' (2007)

Notes

References

Bibliography

Mathis, Johnny